Leptolalax maoershanensis is a species of frog in the family Megophryidae. Its type locality is Maoershan Nature Reserve (广西猫儿山国家级自然保护区) in Guilin, Guangxi, China.

References

maoershanensis
Frogs of China
Amphibians described in 2017